Never Back Down: Revolt is an 2021 American martial arts film, directed by Kellie Madison and written by Audrey Arkins. It is the fourth film in the Never Back Down series. The film was released digitally and on DVD on November 16, 2021.

Plot
A woman who is kidnapped and forced to compete in elite underground, fights her way out to freedom.

Cast
 Olivia Popica as Anya
 Michael Bisping as Janek 
 Brooke Johnston as Mariah
 Vanessa Campos
 Diana Hoyos
 Neetu Chandra as Jaya 
 James Faulkner as Julian

Production
The film's cast and director was announced in November 2020 and the filming began in London on November 23.

References

External links
 

2021 films
2021 direct-to-video films
American martial arts films
Direct-to-video sequel films
2020s English-language films
Films shot in London
Sony Pictures direct-to-video films
Mandalay Pictures films
Destination Films films
Mixed martial arts films
2020s American films